Winners is the second album by American New York City based Kleeer.

Track listing
"Winners" (Norman Durham, Woody Cunningham)  7:09
"I Still Love You" (Woody Cunningham)  4:12
"Your Way" (Norman Durham, Woody Cunningham)  4:44
"Close To You" (Richard Lee Jr.)  5:24
"Rollin' On" (Paul Crutchfield, Woody Cunningham)  3:49
"Nothin' Said" (Woody Cunningham)  4:54 
"Hunger For Your Love" (Paul Crutchfield, Richard Lee Jr.)   5:34
"Open Your Mind" (Norman Durham, Woody Cunningham)  6:44

Personnel
 Norman Durham - Clavinet, Fender Rhodes electric piano, guitar, harpsichord, Arp Omni Omnichord, percussion, lead and backing vocals
Woody Cunningham - drums, percussion, lead and backing vocals
Paul Crutchfield - congas, percussion, backing vocals
Terry Dolphin - Clavinet, Fender Rhodes electric piano, grand piano
Richard Lee - guitar, percussion, backing vocals
 Eric Rohrbaugh - Clavinet, Fender Rhodes electric piano, Arp Omni Omnichord, Mini-Moog synthesizer 
Louis Small - Fender Rhodes electric piano
Eddie Martinez - guitar
Jon Faddis, Randy Brecker - trumpet
Alan Raph - trombone
Brooks Tillotson - French horn
Michael Brecker - tenor saxophone
Eddie Daniels - alto saxophone
Gene Orloff - concertmaster
Carlos Franzetti - strings and horns conductor
Isabelle Coles - lead vocals on "I Still Love You"
Carol Sylvan, Melanie Moore,  Yvette Flowers - backing vocals

Charts

Singles

References

External links
 Kleeer-Winners at Discogs

1979 albums
Kleeer albums
Atlantic Records albums